Claude Fraysse (1941–2012) was a French composer.

History 
Fraysse was born in Versailles on 31 July 1941. In the 1960s, he played in the varieté orchestra "Johann Ness" as a saxophonist, akkordion player and flutist, and also worked as a chanson singer. He collaborated with Charles Aznavour and Jacques Brel, among others, who became his friends.

In the 1970s, he taught trombone and tuba at the conservatoire in Romans. Influenced by Alain Bergese, who taught classical guitar there, he became interested in Christianity in 1973. He composed melodies for hymns, aimed at bringing young people to singing. He organised music groups such as Les troubadours de l'Espoir, and held seminars promoting new Christian songs. From 1974, he also gave music lessons at schools. In 1993, he became a pastor of the Reformed Church. He recorded songs, and published a book narrating his conversion.

His song "Je louerai l’Eternel" (I will praise the Eternal one) with a harmonisation by Bergese, was translated into German as Ich lobe meinen Gott von ganzem Herzen and became a popular new hymn.

References

External links 
 
 

1941 births
2012 deaths
20th-century French composers
Trombonists
People from Versailles